Strawdog Studios Ltd. is a video game developer based in Derby, United Kingdom. The studio was established in 2003 and develops games and applications for mobile phone, iOS, Android, PC, PlayStation 3, Xbox 360, Wii, PlayStation Portable, and Nintendo DS.

History 

In 2007, Strawdog Studios released their first original title Geon: Emotions on Xbox Live Arcade (XBLA). This initial version of the game focused on multiplayer competition with each player's capabilities based around an 'emotions' theme. It featured single player or split-screen two-player modes as well as 2-4 multiplayer online modes over Xbox Live.

In September 2008, the studio released a new 'definitive' version of Geon for PS3 with Wii and PC versions to follow in 2009. The updated version features many improvements over the original, with stronger single player modes, tighter gameplay rules, and a much simpler fusion of the emotions and powerballs theme.

In March 2009, the company announced that it would be expanding into iPhone/iPod Touch development. In April 2009, the company released their first iPhone/iPod Touch game Turbo Duck.

The studio's first self-published original title Space Ark, was released on 16 June 2010 on Xbox Live Arcade.

More recently the studio has developed the official Peppa Pig and Fireman Sam iOS apps. All of which have received positive reviews and reached the #1 top-grossing app slot at some point since their release.

The studio continues to focus on games and applications with universal appeal and family values.

Games

External links
Company website
MobyGames entry

Video game companies of the United Kingdom
Video game development companies
Video game companies established in 2003